"Stranger in Town" is a hit song by American rock band Toto from their 1984 album Isolation.

It was the first single released from that album, reaching the top 30 on the Billboard Hot 100 in December 1984.  The song was the band's highest-ever charting Mainstream Rock track, eventually peaking at number 7. It was also a top 40 single in Australia, where it remains the fourth highest charting single by Toto, behind only "Hold the Line", "Rosanna", and "Africa". The song was written by David Paich and Jeff Porcaro, and features Paich on lead vocals. Though Bobby Kimball is officially credited as a guest musician on the album, having been fired from Toto, "Stranger in Town" was recorded while he was still a member of the group.

The song was performed live during the 1985 Isolation tour as well as during the first leg of the subsequent Fahrenheit tour in October–November 1986 before being dropped for the second (European) leg of the tour. It then only resurfaced in the band's live set in 2015-16 (on the Toto XIV tour) and again in 2018 (40 Trips around the Sun tour).

Music video
The music video (filmed in black and white and directed by Steve Barron) and lyrics to the song are based on the film Whistle Down The Wind, about an escaped convict who runs into a group of children that mistake him for Jesus. Actor Brad Dourif plays the convict, and new member Fergie Frederiksen appears as a murder victim.  Dourif and Toto would also work on the movie Dune that same year. The band only appears briefly in the music video at the 2 minute 30 second mark of the song. In 1985, the video was nominated at the MTV Music Video Awards for Best Direction.

Personnel

Toto
 Steve Lukather – guitars, backing vocals
 David Paich – lead and backing vocals, synthesizer
 Steve Porcaro – synthesizer
 Mike Porcaro – bass guitar
 Jeff Porcaro – drums, percussion
 Fergie Frederiksen – backing vocals

Additional musicians
Mike Cotten – synthesizer
Tom Scott – saxophone
Gene Morford – bass vocal
Bobby Kimball – backing vocal
Richard Page - backing vocal

Charts

References

External links
 Lyrics
 YouTube video

1984 songs
1984 singles
Toto (band) songs
Songs written by David Paich
Songs written by Jeff Porcaro
Columbia Records singles
Music videos directed by Steve Barron
Black-and-white music videos